Auguste Verdyck (8 February 1902 in Schoten – 14 February 1988 in Merksem) was a Belgian professional road bicycle racer. He was a professional from 1924 to 1939. His brother Lucien Verdijck was also a professional cyclist.

Major results
1924
 1st Paris–Nantes
 2nd Schaal Sels
1925
 1st  Overall Tour of the Basque Country
1st Stage 3
 1st Paris–Nantes
 1st Stage 2 Critérium des Aiglons
 2nd National Road Race Championships
 3rd Overall Tour of Belgium
1st Stage 5
 8th Overall Tour de France
1928
 2nd National Cyclo-cross Championships
1932
 2nd Nationale Sluitingprijs
 3rd Scheldeprijs

References

External links 

1902 births
1988 deaths
Belgian male cyclists
People from Schoten
Cyclists from Antwerp Province